Green Grow the Lilacs is a folk song of Irish origin that was popular in the United States during the mid-19th century.

The song title is the source of a folk etymology for the word gringo that states that the Mexicans misheard U.S. troops singing "green grow" during the Mexican–American War.

The song appears in the 1931 stage play of the same name by Lynn Riggs, which is the basis of the 1943 musical Oklahoma!

Recordings
 1941 Tony Kraber – included in the 78rpm album The Old Chisholm Trail – Songs Of The American Southwest.
 1957 Gordon MacRae – included in his album Cowboy's Lament.
 1959 Bing Crosby and Rosemary Clooney – included in the album How the West Was Won.
 1959 Harry Belafonte Recorded in 1958 and released in 1959 on the RCA LP "Love Is a Gentle Thing" LSP1927
 1963 Chad Mitchell Trio
 1965 Johnny Cash
 1966 Tex Ritter
 1976 The Blue Sky Boys (Bill And Earl Bolick)

Versions
There are many different versions of the lyrics.

Notes

Irish folk songs